Derrick Peak is a prominent ice-free peak,  high, overlooking the south side of Hatherton Glacier, 3 nautical miles (6 km) west of the north end of Johnstone Ridge. It was named by the Advisory Committee on Antarctic Names for Robert O. Derrick of the U.S. Weather Bureau, who served as assistant to the United States Antarctic Research Program Representative at Christchurch from 1960 until his death in 1966.

Further reading 
 Gunter Faure, Teresa M. Mensing, The Transantarctic Mountains: Rocks, Ice, Meteorites and Water, P 664
 Kevin Righter, 35 Seasons of U.S. Antarctic Meteorites (1976-2010): A Pictorial Guide To The Collection, PP 13, 15, 79

References

Mountains of Oates Land